The Melodi Grand Prix Junior 2013 was Norway's twelfth national Melodi Grand Prix Junior for young singers aged 8 to 15. It was held in Oslo Spektrum, Oslo, Norway and was hosted by Tooji and Margrethe Røed. The show was broadcast live Norwegian Broadcasting Corporation (NRK).

The winner was Unik 4 made up of Simen, Audun, Annika and Eline, all of which were born in 1999 and come from Bø in Telemark, Norway with the song "Så sur da". Unik 4 played violins, keyboards and drums and in between themselves were said to be able to play 10 musical instruments in addition to their vocal talents. The other Final 4 contestants were the duo Synne & Ingrid, solo act Henrik and the group A-stream.

The album Melodi Grand Prix Junior 2013 containing the songs of the finals reached No. 1 on the VG-lista Norwegian Albums Chart on weeks 36 and 37 of 2012 staying at No. 1 for two weeks.

Results

First round

Super Final
The exact number of public votes was unknown. Only the winner was announced.

References

External links
Official website

Melodi Grand Prix Junior
Music festivals in Norway